Hypoxia-inducible factor-proline dioxygenase (HIF hydroxylase) is an enzyme with systematic name hypoxia-inducible factor-L-proline, 2-oxoglutarate:oxygen oxidoreductase (4-hydroxylating). This enzyme catalyses the following chemical reaction

 hypoxia-inducible factor-L-proline + 2-oxoglutarate + O2  hypoxia-inducible factor-trans-4-hydroxy-L-proline + succinate + CO2

Hypoxia-inducible factor-proline dioxygenase contains iron, and requires ascorbate.

Hypoxia-inducible factor (HIF) is an evolutionarily conserved transcription factor that allows the cell to respond physiologically to low concentrations of oxygen.  A class of prolyl hydroxylases which act specifically on HIF has been identified; hydroxylation of HIF allows the protein to be targeted for degradation. HIF prolyl-hydroxylase has been targeted by a variety of inhibitors that aim to treat stroke, kidney disease, ischemia, anemia, and other important diseases. Clinically observed prolyl hydroxylase domain mutations, as in the case of erythrocytosis- and breast cancer-associated PHD2 mutations, affect its selectivity for its HIF substrate, which has important implication for drug design.

In humans, there are three isoforms of hypoxia-inducible factor-proline dioxygenase. These are PHD1, PHD2 and PHD3. PHD2, in particular, was identified as the most important human oxygen sensors due to its slow reaction with oxygen.

References

External links 

EC 1.14.11